Roy Maloy (born Roy Timothy McPherson, 27 October 1975 in Melbourne, Victoria), is an Australian stilt walker, fire breather and stunt performer.

Career
A Victorian provincial newspaper described Maloy as "Australian Circus King."

Stilt-walking records
In 2008, Maloy set an unverified world record for the tallest stilts ever walked on: on 1 November, after 11 attempts, he took five independent steps on  stilts each weighing almost .

In June 2011, Maloy attempted to set a record by walking more than 5 km in under an hour on 91.4 cm wooden stilts weighing 3.5 kg.

Honorary titles
On 16 March 2010, Maloy was King of the Parade at the Brimbank Festival in Sunshine, Victoria.

Literature & Publications
Maloy has published a number of books on Australian biography. His titles include the biography of Australian gangster "Squizzy" Taylor, and the biography of Western Australia's Luna Park,  "The Dark Side of the Moon".

References

Further reading
 Landline, 25 July 2010 "Far Flung Fun"

1975 births
Living people
Australian stunt performers
People from Melbourne